Lloyd Miller may refer to:

Lloyd Miller (musician) (born 1938), American musician
Lloyd Miller (athlete) (1915–1985), Australian athlete
Lloyd Tevis Miller (1872–1951), American physician
Lloyd I Miller III (1934-2018), American investor